The West Cape York Marine Park (formerly known as the West Cape York Commonwealth Marine Reserve) is an Australian marine park offshore of Queensland and to the west of the Cape York Peninsula. It is one of 8 parks managed under the North Marine Parks Network.

Conservation values

Species and habitat
Important resting area for turtles between egg laying (internesting area), for the threatened: flatback turtle, hawksbill turtle and olive ridley turtle.
Important roosting area for aggregations of the migratory lesser frigate bird.

Bioregions and ecology
Examples of the ecosystems of two provincial bioregions: the Northern Shelf Province (which includes the Carpentaria and West Cape York mesoscale bioregions) and the Northeast Shelf Transition Province (which includes the Torres Strait meso-scale bioregion)
Gulf of Carpentaria coastal zone (high productivity; biodiversity and endemism; aggregations of marine life)
Gulf of Carpentaria basin (biodiversity; aggregations of marine life)

History
The marine park was proclaimed under the EPBC Act on 14 December 2013 and renamed West Cape York Marine Park on 9 October 2017. The management plan and protection measures of the marine park came into effect for the first time on 1 July 2018.

Summary of protection zones
The West Cape York Marine Park has been assigned IUCN protected area category IV. However, within the marine park there are three protection zones, each zone has an IUCN category and related rules for managing activities to ensure the protection of marine habitats and species.

The following table is a summary of the zoning rules within the West Cape York Marine Park:

See also

 Protected areas managed by the Australian government

References

External links
 North Marine Parks Network - Parks Australia
 North Marine Parks Network - environment.gov.au (outdated)

Australian marine parks